"Unbelievers" is a song by American indie pop band Vampire Weekend. Written by the band's lead singer Ezra Koenig and multi-instrumentalist Rostam Batmanglij, and produced by Ariel Rechtshaid and Batmanglij, the song was released as the third single from their third studio album Modern Vampires of the City in August 2013. The band initially premiered "Unbelievers" in a live performance on Jimmy Kimmel Live on October 31, 2012.   They also performed the song live on an episode of Saturday Night Live prior to it being released as a single.

Commercial performance
The song peaked at number seven on the Billboard Alternative Songs chart, becoming the band's first top ten hit on the chart, and has also peaked at number 24 on the Billboard Hot Rock Songs chart and number 158 on the UK Singles Chart.

Personnel
Vampire Weekend
 Chris Baio – bass
 Rostam Batmanglij – piano, guitars, banjo, vocal harmonies and backing vocals, drum and synth programming, keyboards, shaker
 Ezra Koenig – lead vocals, piano
 Chris Tomson – drums

Additional musicians
 Johnny Bravo – flistle
 Brendan Ryan – accordion
 Elizabeth Lea – trombone
 Danny T. Levin – trumpet
 Seth Shafer – tuba
 Ariel Rechtshaid – additional drum and synth programming

Technical
 Scott Jacoby – mixing
 Emily Lazar – mixing, mastering
 Joe LaPorta – mastering

Charts

Weekly charts

Year-end charts

Certifications

References

2013 songs
2013 singles
Vampire Weekend songs
Songs written by Ezra Koenig
Song recordings produced by Ariel Rechtshaid
XL Recordings singles
Songs written by Rostam Batmanglij